Over the course of English parliamentary history there were a number of Acts of Uniformity. All had the basic object of establishing some sort of religious orthodoxy within the Church of England.

The Act of Uniformity 1549 (2 & 3 Edw. 6, c. 1), also called Act of Equality, which established the Book of Common Prayer as the only legal form of worship
The Act of Uniformity 1552 (5 & 6 Edw. 6, c. 1) required the use of the Book of Common Prayer of 1552
The Act of Uniformity 1559 (1 Eliz., c. 2), adopted on the accession of Elizabeth I
The Act of Uniformity 1662 (14 Car 2, c. 4), enacted after the restoration of the monarchy
The Act of Uniformity (Explanation) Act 1663 (15 Car 2, c. 6)
The Act of Uniformity Amendment Act 1872, modified the preceding acts

See also
Act of Supremacy
Nonconformist
Conformist
Test Act
Conventicle Act 1664
Occasional Conformity Act 1711
Religion in the United Kingdom
Religious uniformity
List of short titles

Acts of the Parliament of England concerning religion
History of the Church of England
Christianity and law in the 16th century